Partick was a county constituency represented in the House of Commons of the Parliament of the United Kingdom from 1885 until 1918.

A division of the county of Lanarkshire, its territory was incorporated into the city of Glasgow in the 1890s. For the 1918 general election, it was largely replaced by the new Glasgow Partick constituency, a division of the city of Glasgow.

Boundaries 

From 1885 the constituency consisted of "So much of the Parish of Govan as lies north of the Clyde and beyond the present boundary of the municipal burgh of Glasgow, and so much of the parish of Barony as lies to the west of the present main line of railway between Glasgow and Edinburgh of the North British Railway Company (being the old Edinburgh and Glasgow Railway) and beyond the present boundary of the municipal burgh of Glasgow."

Members of Parliament

Elections

Elections in the 1880s

Elections in the 1890s

Elections in the 1900s

Elections in the 1910s

General Election 1914–15:

Another General Election was required to take place before the end of 1915. The political parties had been making preparations for an election to take place and by the July 1914, the following candidates had been selected; 
Liberal: Robert Balfour
Unionist: Robert Horne

References 

Historic parliamentary constituencies in Scotland (Westminster)
Constituencies of the Parliament of the United Kingdom established in 1885
Constituencies of the Parliament of the United Kingdom disestablished in 1918
Politics of Glasgow
Partick